This article presents a list of the historical events and publications of Australian literature during 1907.

Books 

 Barbara Baynton – Human Toll
 Guy Boothby – The Man of the Crag
 E. J. Brady – The King's Caravan: Across Australia in a Wagon
 Ada Cambridge – The Eternal Feminine
 G. B. Lancaster 
 The Altar Stairs
 The Tracks We Tread
 Ambrose Pratt 
 The Big Five
 Jan Digby
 The Leather Mask

Short stories

 W. R. Charleton – The Red Kangaroo and Other Australian Short Stories (edited)
 Edward Dyson – "At a Boxing Bout"
 Henry Lawson – "The Rising of the Court"
 Rosa Praed – The Luck of the Leura
 Steele Rudd – The Poor Parson
 Ethel Turner – The Stolen Voyage

Poetry 

 James Lister Cuthbertson
 "Australian Sunrise"
 "Wattle and Myrtle"
 Victor Daley – "The Night Ride"
 Charles Harpur
 "Love"
 "Words"
 Henry Lawson
 "The Bush Beyond the Range"
 "Who'll Wear the Beaten Colours?"
 Will Lawson – "A Song of Wind"
 Hugh McCrae 
 "Fantasy"
 "Never Again"
 John Shaw Neilson 
 "In the Street"
 "The Land Where I Was Born"
 "Old Granny Sullivan"
 Will H. Ogilvie – Rainbows and Witches
 Bertram Stevens – An Anthology of Australian Verse (edited)

Births 

A list, ordered by date of birth (and, if the date is either unspecified or repeated, ordered alphabetically by surname) of births in 1907 of Australian literary figures, authors of written works or literature-related individuals follows, including year of death.

 21 July – A. D. Hope, poet and critic (died 2000)
 9 October – John O'Grady, novelist (died 1981)
 18 November – Gwen Meredith, novelist and dramatist (died 2006)

Unknown date
 G.C. Bleeck – novelist (died 1971)

Deaths 

A list, ordered by date of death (and, if the date is either unspecified or repeated, ordered alphabetically by surname) of deaths in 1907 of Australian literary figures, authors of written works or literature-related individuals follows, including year of birth.

 22 July – Francis Myers, poet (born ca. 1854)

See also 
 1907 in poetry
 List of years in literature
 List of years in Australian literature
 1907 in literature
 1906 in Australian literature
 1907 in Australia
 1908 in Australian literature

References

Literature
Australian literature by year
20th-century Australian literature